Pilot Talk II is the fourth studio album by rapper Curren$y. The majority of the album was produced by Ski Beatz and The Senseis. Curren$y himself stated in an interview that the album would be released October 26, 2010. The album was moved back and released on November 22, 2010.

Promotion
As with Pilot Talk, Pilot Talk II was given viral promotion with video blogging through DD172's online media network CreativeControl.tv as well as through their Vimeo page.

Singles
The first single, "Michael Knight", was released for download on October 12, 2010. A video for the single premiered on CreativeControl.tv as well as their Vimeo page on November 6, 2010. A music video for the song "Hold On" was released on December 26, 2010 via Vimeo.

Track listing

References

2010 albums
Currensy albums
Albums produced by Ski Beatz
Sequel albums